The Miccosukee Tribe of Indians of Florida is a federally recognized Native American tribe in the U.S. state of Florida. They were part of the Seminole nation until the mid-20th century, when they organized as an independent tribe, receiving federal recognition in 1962. The Miccosukee speak the Mikasuki language, which is mutually intelligible with the Hitchiti language, is considered its dialect, and is also spoken by many Florida Seminole.

Historically, the Miccosukee trace their origins to the Lower Chiaha, one of the tribes of the Creek Confederacy in present-day Georgia. Under pressure from European encroachment in their territory, they migrated to northern Florida in the early 18th century, where they became part of the developing Seminole nation. By the late 18th century, the British recorded the name Miccosukee or Mikasuki as designating a Hitchiti-speaking group centered on the village of Miccosukee in the Florida Panhandle.

Like other Seminole groups, they were displaced during the Seminole Wars (1817–1858), and many migrated or were forced to relocate west of the Mississippi River to Indian Territory in 1842, after the Seminole Wars. The Miccosukee chief Ar-pi-uck-i, also known as Sam Jones, proved an effective leader during the Second Seminole War.

Descendants of those who remained in Florida were concentrated in the central part of the state. In the 1920s and 1930s, many Seminole established communities along the Tamiami Trail, a roadway completed in 1928 that ran through the Everglades and connected the cities of Tampa and Miami. The Trail Indians, as they were called, generally kept more traditional practices. They were less interested in establishing formal relations with the federal government than those Cow Creek Seminole to the north who started moving to reservations around the same time.

In 1953, the Seminole were identified for termination of federal status; the Seminole Tribe of Florida organized as a tribe and were recognized in 1957. That process had pointed out cultural differences between the groups, and the Miccosukee gained state recognition separately that year, and federal recognition in 1962. The Traditionals or Independents did not affiliate with either tribe.

History
The Miccosukee historically inhabited the upper Tennessee Valley in present-day Georgia, where they were originally part of the Upper Chiaha. Later they split: the Miccosukee (Lower Chiaha) migrated northeast to the Carolinas and the Upper Chiaha, also known as Muscogee, migrated west to northern Alabama.  Under continuing encroachment pressure from European-American settlers, many migrated to northern Florida during the 18th and 19th centuries.

The Lower Chiaha comprised the major part of the Seminole tribe, which formed in the eighteenth century in Florida through a process of ethnogenesis. They numbered about 6,000 by the early 19th century. About 2,000 Upper Creek (Red Sticks), who were Creek speakers, joined them after defeat in the Creek War of 1813-1814. Although East and West Florida were under Spanish control, United States forces invaded in 1818 in the First Seminole War, in retaliation for Indian raids against settlers in Georgia.

In 1821 the United States (US) acquired Florida from Spain, and it increased pressure for removal against the Seminole/Creek from Florida. It relocated several thousand Seminole and hundreds of Black Seminoles, who lived in close association as allies, to the Indian Territory. They were originally given land under Creek administration and later given a separate reservation.

Those who remained in Florida fought against US forces during the second and third Seminole Wars. They had moved into central Florida and the Everglades to try to evade European-American settlement pressure.  During this period, the Miccosukee mixed with the Creek-speaking Seminole, but many maintained their Mikasuki language and identity.

Twentieth century to present
The tribe had long maintained its distinction from the Seminole, who they believed were more willing to adapt to the majority culture. The federal and state governments persisted in treating them as a unified people, and there was a third group, known as Traditionals or Independents. An issue that divided them was the majority Seminole filing in 1950 with the Indian Claims Commission for claim for compensation for lands taken by the US government. The Miccosukee and Traditionals contended they had never reached an official peace with the US in Florida, and they wanted a return of their land rather than financial compensation. (The United States settlement of the claims with the Seminole and Miccosukee in Florida, and the Seminole in Oklahoma, was finally made in 1976. Division of shares within the tribes took until 1990 to settle.)

Under the federal government's program of termination of recognition, it proposed in 1953 that the Seminole Tribe be terminated. The Seminole Tribe of Florida developed a constitution and corporate charter, organizing a government, which achieved federal recognition in 1957. These people had begun to move onto designated Indian reservations in Florida starting in the 1930s and 1940s.

The land claims and termination controversies heightened the distinction for the Trail People, who became more defined and began to organize as the Miccosukee Seminole Tribe; they were mostly Mikasuki language speakers. They were recognized by the state of Florida in 1957, and gained federal recognition in 1962 as the Miccosukee Tribe of Indians of Florida.

The tribe today occupies several reservations in southern Florida, collectively known as the Miccosukee Indian Reservation. It may use "this land for the purpose of hunting, fishing, frogging, and subsistence agriculture to carry on the traditional Miccosukee way of life." Another site is its Alligator Alley Reservation, located near Ft. Lauderdale. They provide use permits for non-Natives to use some of the wetlands for hunting camps.

Among their lands is a site in Miami, where the tribe in 1999 developed the Miccosukee  Resort & Conference Hotel, which includes gaming facilities. The revenue from this enterprise has supported economic development and improvements to education and welfare. They have generally modern housing on their reservation 40 miles west of Miami, and some of the tribe live in suburban Miami.

Membership
The Miccosukee requires members to have at least half-Miccosukee ancestry, and will accept individuals with Miccosukee mothers who are not enrolled in any other Tribe. The tribe has a matrilineal system of kinship and inheritance. Children are considered to be born into their mother's clan, from which they gain their status in the tribe. In this system, the mother's older brother is highly important to her children, more than the biological father, especially for boys. The uncle is the one who introduces the boys to the men's groups of the clan and tribe.

Government
The tribe has a written constitution and elects officers, including a chief. In 2015, Chief Colley Billie was removed from office for financial mismanagement. As of 2020, the current chief is Billy Cypress. All adult members are part of the General Council, which manages the tribal services. The first chief at the time of federal recognition was Buffalo Tiger, who continued to lead as tribal chairman until 1985.

The tribe operates its own police and court system. It also has a clinic, day care center; senior center; Community Action Agency and an educational system, ranging from the Head Start Pre-School Program through senior high school. Adult, vocational and higher education programs are also available.

Business interests

The tribe operates the 302-room Miccosukee Resort & Gaming hotel in Miami-Dade county.

Sports sponsorship has extended to several teams in NASCAR, primarily Phoenix Racing and Billy Ballew Motorsports. These include the 2009 Aaron's 499 winning Sprint Cup Series car driven by Brad Keselowski, a Camping World truck driven by Kyle Busch, and a Nationwide car driven by Mike Bliss. The Miccosukee relationship with NASCAR dates to 2002, ending prior to the start of the 2010 season.

Museum
The Miccosukee Indian Village Museum was founded in 1983. The museum offers to its visitors a variety of artistic expressions such as native paintings, hand crafts, and photographs. Additionally, it is possible to find some artifacts such as cooking utensils that are also on display. The Museum is located in 41 Tamiami Trail, Miami, FL, 33131.

Education
Miccosukee Indian School is the tribal school.

Notable Miccosukee
Kinhagee, the last chief of the Creek of Miccosukee, Florida, who was defeated in battle in 1818 by US forces commanded by General Andrew Jackson. Later Kinhagee's people migrated south, maintaining their local village name Miccosukee as the name of the tribe.
Buffalo Tiger (Heenehatche), (1920–2015), first chief of the Miccosukee Tribe of Indians of Florida, led initiatives for self-determination

Notes

References
Mahon, John K.; Brent R. Weisman (1996). "Florida's Seminole and Miccosukee Peoples". In Gannon, Michael (Ed.). The New History of Florida, pp. 183–206. University Press of Florida. .

Tiger, Buffalo and Harry A. Kersey, Buffalo Tiger: A Life in the Everglades, University of Nevada Press, 2008

Further reading
 Ewen, Alexander and Jeffrey Wollock. "Tiger, William Buffalo." Encyclopedia of the American Indian in the Twentieth Century, New York: Facts On File, Inc., 2014. American Indian History Online. Facts On File, Inc. http://www.fofweb.com/activelink2.asp? ItemID=WE43&iPin=ENAIT516&SingleRecord=True (accessed August 14, 2014).
 James A. Goss, Usual and Customary Use and Occupancy by the Miccosukee and Seminole Indians in Big Cypress National Preserve, Florida National Park Service, 1995, (pdf)
 Kersey, Harry A. An Assumption of Sovereignty: Social and Political Transformation Among the Florida Seminoles, 1953-1979, University of Nebraska Press, 1996

External links

Miccosukee Tribe, Official Website
Miccosukee Resort & Gaming, website
Miccosukee Land Co-op, a co-housing community

Federally recognized tribes in the United States
Native American tribes in Florida